Koryak Air Enterprise was a Russian passenger and cargo airline based in Kamchatka, Russia. From 2006 it was government subsidised. It merged with Petropavlovsk-Kamchatsky Air Enterprise in 2010.

Fleet

Incidents
A Mil Mi-8T (RA-24209) cargo flight was at an altitude of 850 meters the crew made an emergency landing in a mountainous area in the upper reaches of the river Zhgachka, during which the helicopter collided with the ground and partially collapsed. The co-pilot and flight engineer were wounded. The captain phoned for help and, after helping the wounded, went back into the helicopter where he was later found dead - from suicide by hanging. According to preliminary information, the reason for a forced landing was either an ice buildup or overloading of the helicopter. Subsequent investigation revealed ice to be the cause of stalling with the helicopter's altitude too low for it to regain height on restarting.

References

External links
Defunct website

Defunct airlines of Russia
1956 establishments in Russia
Airlines established in 1956
2010 disestablishments in Russia
Airlines disestablished in 2010
Companies based in Kamchatka Krai